For information on all Siena College sports, see Siena Saints

The Siena Saints football (formerly the Siena Indians) program was the intercollegiate American football team for Siena College located in Loudonville, New York. The team competed in the NCAA Division I-AA and were members of the Metro Atlantic Athletic Conference. The school's first football team was fielded in 1965. Siena participated in football from 1965 to 2003, compiling an all-time record of 124–215–3. On January 21, 2004, Siena announced it was discontinuing its D I-AA football program. The discontinuation of the football program saved $200,000 from the school Athletic Department's annual budget, which was reallocated into other areas within the Athletic Department.

Head coaches

Notable former players
Ron James
Jeff Hafley
 Casey McCanta

References

 
1965 establishments in New York (state)
2003 disestablishments in New York (state)
American football teams established in 1965
American football teams disestablished in 2003